Mended Hearts is a United States-based charity which functions as a support group for individuals suffering from heart disease. It was founded in 1951 by cardiac surgery pioneer Dwight Harken. Dr. Dwight Harken was the first surgeon in history to repeatedly perform successful heart surgery. Dwight Harken asked four post-surgery heart patients to get together to give encouragement and support to each other and prospective patients. It was there that these patients spoke of their "mended hearts". Mended Hearts offers a program for the families of children born with congenital heart defects known as Mended Little Hearts.

Mended Hearts is the largest heart patient peer support network in the world. Mended Hearts partners with 460 hospitals and rehabilitation clinics across the United States. Its 285 chapters and 21,000 volunteers touch the lives of patients throughout North America, assisting patients and caregivers from diagnosis through recovery with social, emotional, and practical support. Mended Hearts is recognized for its role in fostering a positive patient-care experience, and provides services to heart patients through visiting programs, educational forums, and support group meetings.

References

External links 
 Mended Hearts official site.
 Mended Little Hearts official site.

Organizations for children with health issues
Heart disease organizations
Medical and health organizations based in Texas